Ceredigion County Council is the governing body for the county of Ceredigion, since 1996 one of the unitary authorities of Wales. The council's main offices are in Aberaeron.

History
The current council was created on 1 April 1996 under the Local Government (Wales) Act 1994, replacing Ceredigion District Council and also taking over county-level functions in the area from Dyfed County Council, which was abolished. The 1994 act specified that the new authority was to have both an English and a Welsh name: Cardiganshire / Sir Aberteifi. The new authority was elected in 1995, but acted as a shadow authority alongside the outgoing district and county councils until the new arrangements took effect the following year. During that time, the shadow authority requested a change of name from Cardiganshire / Sir Aberteifi to Ceredigion for both languages. The government confirmed the change with effect from 2 April 1996, one day after the new council came into being.

Public health
The county had the lowest rates of people infected with or dying from COVID-19 in the British mainland, up to June 2020.  The area is naturally rural and holiday attractions and the university were closed down very early.  The council set up its own contact tracing system in March 2020.

Political control
The first election to the new council was held in 1995, initially operating as a shadow authority before coming into its powers on 1 April 1996. Political control of the council since 1996 has been held by the following parties:

Leadership
The leaders of the council since 1996 have been:

Current composition 
As of 30 January 2023.

Party with majority control in bold

Council elections 

Elections take place every five years. The last full county election took place on 5 May 2022. The next election is due in May 2027.

Party with the most elected councillors in bold. Coalition agreements in notes column.

Premises
Since the local government reorganisation in 1996, the council has had its meeting place and main offices at Neuadd Cyngor Ceredigion at Penmorfa in Aberaeron. The building was erected in the early 1990s for the council's predecessor, Ceredigion District Council.

When the council was created in 1996 it inherited various offices from its predecessor authorities, including Swyddfa'r Sir in Aberystwyth, which had been built as the Queen's Hotel in 1866 and had served as the headquarters of the former Cardiganshire County Council from 1950 until 1974, then served as an area office for Dyfed County Council from 1974 until 1996. The council also inherited Aberystwyth Town Hall, which had been the headquarters of Ceredigion District Council. Both these Aberystwyth offices closed in 2009 when the council opened a new Aberystwyth area office at Canolfan Rheidol in Llanbadarn Fawr on the outskirts of Aberystwyth. The council also has area offices in Lampeter and Cardigan.

Electoral divisions

The county is divided into 40 electoral wards returning 42 councillors.  There are 50 communities in the area, some of which have their own elected council.  Many communities are coterminous with council wards.  The following table lists council wards, communities and associated geographical areas.  Communities with a community council are indicated with an asterisk.

Arms

References

External links
Ceredigion County Council

 
County councils of Wales
1996 establishments in Wales